Spirit Lake may refer to:

Communities
In the United States:
Spirit Lake, Idaho
Spirit Lake, Iowa
Spirit Lake Tribe in North Dakota

Lakes

Canada
 Spirit Lake (Yukon) in the Yukon Territory
 Spirit Lake (Saskatchewan) in Saskatchewan
 Good Spirit Lake in Saskatchewan

United States
 Spirit Lake (Idaho)
 Spirit Lake (Iowa), in northwestern Iowa
 Spirit Lake (South Dakota), in eastern South Dakota
 Spirit Lake (Utah), Eastern, North slope Uintah Mountains
 Spirit Lake (Washington), in southwestern Washington
 Spirit Lake (Price County, Wisconsin)

Other
 Spirit Lake Massacre, an 1857 attack by Sioux on settlers in Spirit Lake, Iowa
 Spirit Lake internment camp for Ukrainians in Canada during World War I